The Postal Reorganization Act of 1970 was a law passed by the United States Congress that abolished the then United States Post Office Department, which was a part of the Cabinet, and created the United States Postal Service, a corporation-like independent agency authorized by the US government as an official service for the delivery of mail in the United States. President Richard Nixon signed the Act in law on August 12, 1970.

The legislation was a direct outcome of the U.S. postal strike of 1970. Prior to the act, postal workers were not permitted by law to engage in collective bargaining. In the act, the four major postal unions (National Association of Letter Carriers, American Postal Workers Union, National Postal Mail Handlers Union, and the National Rural Letter Carriers Association) won full collective bargaining rights: the right to negotiate on wages, benefits and working conditions, although they still were not allowed the right to strike.

The first paragraph of the act reads:

The Postal Reorganization Act (at 39 USC 410(c)(2)) exempts the USPS from Freedom of Information Act (FOIA) disclosure of "information of a commercial nature, including trade secrets, whether or not obtained from a person outside the Postal Service, which under good business practice would not be publicly disclosed".

See also
Post Office Act of 1872
Postal Service Act
United States Postal Service

References

External links 
The Postal Reorganization Act (original statute)

1970 in law
United States federal postal legislation